The Montreal Expos were a former Major League Baseball (MLB) franchise based in Montreal, Quebec from 1969 to 2004. The team relocated to Washington, D.C. after the  season and became the Washington Nationals. The first game of the new baseball season for a team is played on Opening Day, and being named the Opening Day starter is an honour, which is often given to the player who is expected to lead the pitching staff that season, though there are various strategic reasons why a team's best pitcher might not start on Opening Day. The Expos used 19 different Opening Day starting pitchers in their 36 seasons. The 19 starters had a combined Opening Day record of 9 wins, 15 losses (9–15) and 12 no decisions. No decisions are awarded to the starting pitcher if the game is won or lost after the starting pitcher has left the game, or if the starting pitcher does not pitch at least five innings with the lead. The overall Opening Day franchise record is 12–24.

Steve Rogers holds the team record for most Opening Day starts with nine, and has an Opening Day record of 2–4, with three no-decisions. All of Rogers's Opening Day starts were on the road.  Liván Hernández is the only pitcher to have made Opening Day starts for both the Expos (in 2004) and Nationals (2005, 2006, and 2011).

For their first 19 Opening Day games, early season cold weather kept the Expos on the road. In 1988, the availability of Olympic Stadium and its retractable roof allowed the team to have its first Opening Day home game, in which Dennis Martínez was the starting pitcher. The Expos never played on Opening Day in Jarry Park Stadium, their home from 1969 to 1976. Olympic Stadium, their home from 1977 to 2004, hosted six Opening Day games; five Expos starters accumulated a record of 0–3 (and three no-decisions).

The franchise's only playoff experience was in the strike-shortened  season. In a special format created for that season, the Expos were the second-half champion, with a 30–23 record. The team won the NL Division Series to become Eastern Division champions, winning three games to two over Philadelphia Phillies who had been the first-half champion with a 34–21 record. In 1981, Opening Day pitcher Steve Rogers faced Phillies ace Steve Carlton and won the first game of the series by a score of 3–1. The Expos then lost the NL Championship Series to the first-half Western Division champion Los Angeles Dodgers three games to two on a ninth-inning home run in Game 5 by Rick Monday.

Key

Pitchers 

 The scheduled Opening Day starter for April 1, 1996, was Pedro Martínez. Due to the death of umpire John McSherry, the game was postponed. Jeff Fassero then started the April 2 makeup game.

References 

Opening day starters
Lists of Major League Baseball Opening Day starting pitchers
Montreal Expos opening day starting pitchers